Water Pik may refer to:

Water Pik, an American personal care products company
Water Pik (product), an oral healthcare product